Israeli hip hop refers to hip hop and rap music in Israel.

History

Although Native Hebrew hip hop gained popularity only during the 1990s, stemming from global influences, traces of it could be found during the mid-1980s. Yair Nitzani, then a member of the Israeli rock group, "Tislam", released an old school hip hop parody album under the name "Hashem Tamid". Nitzani was mainly influenced from New York old school Hip Hop. In 1993, Nigel Haadmor and Yossi Fine, influenced by Eric B & Rakim and Flame-3 of the TPA Crew and other late 1980s Hip Hop, produced the album "Humus Metamtem", which was released by Yair Nitzani. Yossi Fine later immigrated to New York, where he played as a bassist with artists such as David Bowie, Naughty by Nature and Lou Reed. Nigel Haadmor is the pseudonym of Yehoshua Sofer, a Jewish-Jamaican Broslov Hasidic Jew who was born in Jamaica and raised in Jamaica, the U.S., and Israel. Influenced by his mother, who listened to Jamaican ska at home, Haadmor produced a unique sound based on his Caribbean roots living in the Jewish state.

In 1995, the Beastie Boys toured Israel and were interviewed by Quami de la Fox (Eyal Freedman) on Galgalatz, the Israeli Army's radio station and most popular radio station of that time. After the interview, Quami de la Fox created a Hebrew parody of their song “So What’cha Want” to promote their tour in Israel. Later that year Quami de la Fox collaborated with DJ Liron Teeni, also a host on the Galgalatz station, to produce Esek Shachor (Black Business) – the first all hip hop radio show in Israel. Playing a mix of Hebrew, Arabic and English hip hop, by 2000 Esek Shachor “was the most popular program on Galgalatz and today remains a leader in Israel’s hip-hop world.”

Just as Kool Herc is credited in America as being a founding father of hip hop, DJ Liron Teeni is given similar credit as the pioneer of Israeli hip-hop. His major role in the process of making Israeli hip hop the popular genre it is in Israel today was the transformation of the lyrics to the mother tongue of Hebrew. Kids would come on his show on the army radio station in order to showcase their rapping skills, but when they would start rapping in English, he would make them translate it into Hebrew. Because rappers began to rap in English, it was seen as an American export which was not authentic to the music of Israel.

Popular rock band Shabak Samech is credited with being the first Israeli hip hop group, and began rapping in Hebrew in 1995. Influenced by the Beastie Boys, their lyrics did not have any specific political or social message and were mostly party lyrics. Israeli listeners initially rejected their music. Chemi Arzi, one of the band members, recalls, “‘They said you just can’t rap in Hebrew; it doesn’t sound good.’”  Shabak Samech continued to produce Hebrew-language rap songs in efforts to promote this new style of Hebrew and Mediterranean hip hop. The band was initially marginalized due to the belief of Israeli DJs that their audiences would be lost, but they eventually reached success.

While Israeli hip hop may be seem to have common underlying themes with US hip hop and they share the main elements of hip hop, mainstream hip hop in Israel tends to deal mainly with the situation in the country, spirituality, or politics. Israeli rappers talk about more personal issues such as the struggles of growing up in Israel. Most Jewish Rappers tends to disregard the political situation between Arabs and Jews, yet they refer frequently to the economic situations in the country. Since 2001, with the rising of new Hip Hop acts, most issues are dealing with creation, essence of Hip Hop, street culture, drugs, hedonism, etc.

Some of the songs also gear towards more religious themes since many of the rappers are Jewish or Muslim. Israeli hip hop has such a motivational theme behind it that local governments support the Hip Hop movement that has exploded among Israeli youth. The government has even supported Hip Hop groups who travel to other countries, viewing it as a good outlet for the rest of the world to view them through. Israeli Hip Hop is creating several positive movements among the people of the country that will continue to grow and become even more popular. Some of the things the Israeli rappers rap about can tend to be controversial as well. As far as media exposure of artists who address real issues like child abuse or the future of the state of Israel is concerned, Israeli artists seem to have the same problems getting heard as artists in America; they address current issues but don't get much attention from the radio stations that play popular music or television stations. Before Hip Hop was considered a genre in Israel, pop and disco music were the only genres being played on the radio. When Hip Hop songs started becoming popular, the radio stations refused to play them. They felt that Hip Hop didn't make people feel good so they would not play it. The songs spoke of everything from terrorism and religion to children speaking up about abuse in their home. And as far as the ongoing conflict between the Arab population and the Jewish population, hip hop music seems to document this more accurately from various viewpoints than any other popular music or news medium in Israel. Even the conflict between Arab and Israeli rappers is documented in films such as Channels of Rage which showcases Subliminal and an Arab-Israeli named MC Tamer Nafer whose friendship ended due to political tension.

"Black Business" radio show

Black Business (Hebrew: עסק שחור "Esek Shakhor") is a hip hop radio show, started in 1996, by Liron Teeni and Quami De La Fox. The show broadcast on Galgalatz, the sister-station of Galei-Zahal — the Israeli military radio station.
Back in the '90s, young Israeli rappers, such as cynical-parodic Jerusalem rapper Kodman who was still a kid at the time, as well as most of today's esteemed/famous rappers, all started their career on the show.
The rappers started coming on his show in order to showcase their live freestyle and rhyme skills, to be heard rapping. Some rappers such as Subliminal were rapping in English, and Tenni and others wanted Israeli rap to be in their native language of Hebrew since there were thousands of American groups rapping better in English.

Hip hop for Ethiopian-Israeli youth
Since the 1990s, Ethiopian-Israeli teenagers used the rising reggae and hip hop scenes as a means of forming a community and a sense of belonging. Tel Aviv nightclubs proved to be places of social gathering for Ethiopian-Israeli teenagers, giving them a space to gather and form a collective identity. Teenagers and young adults were able to identify with the black struggle of the music and felt reggae and rap reflected their own experiences. Through identification with historically black American musical styles, Anthropologist Malka Shabtay writes,
Young Ethiopians living in Israel have… transformed their collective and personal experiences of alienation, both real and imagined, into an ideology identifying themselves as the blacks in Israeli society and attributing the relatively poor achievements of Ethiopians and their sense of inferiority and failure to racism. Their language of disappointment, disillusionment and hostility is addressed to those they hold responsible for their situation. They believe Israelis to be prejudiced towards them and see in them the reason that their chances of achieving integration are low: ‘You feel betrayed and are called ‘n-gger’. You made it to Israel and it doesn’t work.’

Identification with the African-American struggle, mainly through music, formed a sense of community and identity among Ethiopian-Israeli teenagers. “Their search for a home is temporarily satisfied by reggae and rap… This encounter with black musical genres is a matter not only of musical taste, but of self-image and image in the eyes of others.” Ethiopian-Israeli reggae and rap, reflecting struggles and racism of daily life of these teenagers, provides a sense of community and identification among Ethiopian-Israeli youth.
Ethiopian Israeli hip-hop groups, and artists like Cafe Shachor Hazak, Axum, Jeremy Cool Habash, and others have become very popular amongst all Israelis, and are growing in popularity as Ethiopian Jews integrate into mainstream Israeli society.

Strong Black Coffee ("Café Shahor Hazak"; קפה שחור חזק) is an Ethiopian-Israeli hip hop duo. The duo were a nominee for the 2015 MTV Europe Music Awards Best Israeli Act award.

Hip hop as a method of globalization

Though hip-hop has been adopted by numerous countries throughout the world, Israel remains as a prime example of the manifestation of “glocalization” in the musical realm. Originally hailing from the Japanese business world, this concept was introduced to the Western world by British sociologist Roland Robertson in the early 1990s. As explained by Hartwig Vens in his article in the World Press, the idea of globalization describes the “rising appearance of artistic hybrids that blend the global and the local” which accurately portray the interplay between these seemingly conflicting scenes. By recognizing the dual nature of glocalization, hip-hop's role within Israeli society can be revealed to show its nature of meshing opposing forces to form a creative and original product. Consistent with Vens’ claim, Israeli hip-hop is thus an imitated art, largely globalized and affected tremendously by the United States, while still displaying distinct characteristics specific to Israeli society and culture.

Many of Israel's hip-hop artists thus reflect upon the integration of global and local influences into their music. Global forces have thus proven to be powerful in affecting and shaping hip-hop in Israel. Even the beginnings of rap music in Israel portray the dominant and significant nature of the Western world on global music. Even once it was first presented on the show, the performers still maintained hip-hop's American origins by rapping solely in English. Only once hip-hop expanded to include other music artists was Hebrew utilized as a language to spread person opinions and beliefs of society. Even then, English was still used as an effective means of rapping and reaching audiences, and many Israeli hip-hop songs today incorporate some aspects of English lyrics or colloquial terms into their content.

Though numerous examples are available, one specific music video exemplifies this phenomenon of language thoroughly. In his video for the song, “Bababa,” Subliminal incorporates various musical elements into his performance, including the talents of Miri Ben-Ari on violin. The first thirty seconds of lyrics rapped are entirely in English and could easily be mistaken for a hip-hop song written and produced in America. Such lyrics as “all my real” and “one is for the money, two is for the show…five for that flow” reveal the immense effect American hip-hop has on music produced halfway around the globe. The music video additionally displays other elements of Americanization including the mention of the Grammys and the presentation of the actors as stereotypical members of the hip-hop subculture. One such African-American man is shown wearing a New York Yankees baseball cap, and scantily clad women dancing throughout the video is representative of the stereotypical American hip-hop culture. Within another one of his music videos, “Toro,” Subliminal further expresses qualities of the Western world. Not only is the video reminiscent of hip-hop in the United States, but it holds some elements of reggaeton and Hispanic roots, especially when explicitly mentioning the word “dinero” in the chorus (Spanish for “money”).

Therefore, throughout Israeli hip-hop music, the borrowing from America is quite apparent in the common usage of English language and slang terms in lyrics, as well as through the incorporation of certain American hip-hop culture elements such as break dancing and specific clothing. Not only has Israel maintained a relationship with the United States in its Americanization and adoption of Western qualities, but it has dispersed its own artifacts to America. Though it surfaced only a decade ago, Israeli hip-hop has successfully spread to the United States, primarily through the fan base of young Jewish Zionists living in America. Specific artists, especially Hadag Nachash and Subliminal, have accumulated fans in America and often travel worldwide (and primarily to the US) on tours to further promote their music. Strong connections are present between America and Israel, mostly due to the grounds upon which Israel was established. Since its creation as a state was a result of the Zionist movement, many Jewish Zionists living in the United States feel a strong sense of pride and personal relationship with their religious homeland. Zionist youths primarily are therefore very involved in the current political and social situations occurring in Israel.
Furthermore, they are extremely receptive to any cultural artifacts being produced and released by Israel's music industry, so the hip-hop music of Israeli artists easily thrives within the American Jewish youth population. Thus, many are thrilled when Israeli hip-hop artists come to America to perform and often sing the lyrics along with the performer.

Just as Israeli hip-hop portrays the global trends present in the current times, situations and qualities personal to this specific country are inherently incorporated into the songs and lyrics. As issues such as politics and religion are being fought through the usage of hip-hop, Israeli rap artists display a wide range of opinions being offered and performed. Just as explained by Liron Teeni, the radio DJ who first introduced American hip-hop to America, this variety of perspectives merely reflect the true reality, since “rappers are taking sides on the issue..hip-hop is about being brave, telling the truth like it is and not looking for excuses…just talking about the real stuff.” Discussions of this “real stuff” portrayed in Israeli hip-hop vary from political divides to social tensions and religious fights. Though the music has been maintained as a space for stratified opinionated beliefs, perhaps it holds the power of ultimately uniting those involved in some of these divisions.

As expected, due to Israel's establishment of a country based on Jewish ideals and beliefs, the many themes contained in hip-hop's lyrics extend to issues of religion. Within the nation, there is an obvious divide between the very religious Jews and those who are more secular;. Tensions between these opposing groups are apparent in numerous settings, especially when discussing the politics of Israel. Many laws in Israel pertain to this subject, such as the requirement that all citizens enter into the army at age 18, men for three years and women for two. The army has therefore become a ubiquitous characteristic of Israel and has been engrained within the culture and society so much so that it is nearly impossible to walk the streets of any Israeli city without witnessing soldiers in green. Religious arguments have arisen though, and a compromise was reached that entitled the ultra-Orthodox Jews to abstain from enlisting in the army, since they would be studying in yeshiva or getting married around age 18. Though it is now expected that the army is composed of mostly seculars, there still do exist tense feelings towards those unwilling to fight in the Israeli Defense Forces. Further laws, such as those pertaining to Shabbat, instigate conflict between the religious and secular. Since Israel was founded upon religious beliefs, many Orthodox Jews desire that cities practically shut down on Shabbat, which at one point was true. Recently though, more stores are open on Shabbat and roads are once again covered in cars traversing the country. Therefore, those religious Jews are frustrated that the country is not based on Judaism as much as it used to be, and secular citizens are upset with the manner in which religion is dictating their lifestyle.

Such rules and social expectations are often either supported or argued against in Israeli hip-hop music, and one particular song perfectly encompasses the religious aspect, as well as the political and social tensions apparent in Israel. Hadag Nachash’s “Shirat Hasticker,” literally meaning, “The Sticker Song,” has proven to be one of the most popular rap songs, both in Israel and the United States. Unique in its content, the song is entirely composed of various bumper stickers found on cars in Israel. Since bumper stickers are very popular in Israel and are often placed on cars to display the driver's political, religious, and social stances, Hadag Nachash accurately portrays the country's numerous perspectives on all localized issues. By collecting a variety of these bumper stickers and listing them as lyrics in the song, opinions as broad as the citizens within Israel are effectively expressed in the one song alone.

While discussing the relationship between global and local influences on Israeli hip-hop to create the effect of “glocalization,” one music video in particular precisely reveals this phenomenon. “Halayla Zeh Ha’zman,” (or “Tonight is the Time”) performed by Alon De Loco and Gad Elbaz, effectively presents the manner in which glocalization has encompassed Israeli hip-hop. Opening with a seeming stand-off between Palestinians and overtly religious Orthodox Jews, the video begins with obvious influences from American hip-hop, primarily in the break dancing performed by both groups and the clothing reminiscent of American style (such as the Puma shirt and the “bling”). The song continues to illustrate glocalization through the incorporation of Middle Eastern sounding beats and rhythms, and the chorus is sung in a voice reminiscent of many Israeli musicians and singers. Thus, the music video acts as a clear representation of how elements derived from global and local sources are utilized in Israel, so as to create a unique hip-hop subculture.

Israeli rappers

BOCA
BOCA was born in 1991 in the Soviet Union, and immigrated to Israel at the age of 1 month.
In 2004, he moved with his parents to Bucharest, Romania.
He started participating in hip hop competitions for the first time when rap was still a hobby for him.
Boca returned to Israel in 2006 and continued to rap.
His song "Lod Bypass" was recognized in different countries and was played on radio stations in Israel.
In 2010 he released his first mix tape "7 Days" which contained six songs that were created in seven days.
A little later, he released the club hit "Della Bocca"with DJ Braindead. His second mixtape "My World Your World" contained 14 tracks.
On January 6, 2011 he issued the album I.H.H.A - Israeli Hip Hop Airlines, which contained 9 tracks.

Hadag Nahash
Hadag Nachash (Hebrew: הדג נחש, English: "The Snake Fish”) formed in 1996 was one of the first rap groups to hit the mainstream in Israel. A sprouting Palestinian scene grew alongside them. Their sound consists of a mixture of Funk, Jazz, world music and western pop. They have been compared frequently to the American hip hop group The Roots since they use a live band instead of a DJ for their backup music. In contrast to the patriotic "Zionist" hip-hop of artists like Subliminal (see below), Hadag Nakhash's music is often satirical and sometimes comes from a left-wing perspective. Two examples for that would be their songs "Gabi & Debi" (Hebrew) which spoofs right-wing Zionist rap music, and "Little man" (English) depicting the despair from the religious collisions in the city of Jerusalem".

Subliminal

Kobi Shimoni, more commonly known as Subliminal (Hebrew: סאבלימינל), is a popular rapper in Israel. The album “The Light and the Shadow” with partner The Shadow has sold 80,000 Records in Israel which is a double Platinum Album. Subliminal was born in Tel Aviv, Israel. He started performing music at age 12, and at age 15 met Yoav Eliasi, who would later become his performing partner under the name "The Shadow" (Ha'Tzel). The two quickly became friends as a result of their mutual love of hip-hop. In 1995 the two began performing in Israeli clubs wearing baggy clothes and gold chains. They quickly developed a following among the nation's youth, and put out their first album, "The Light From Zion". After the outbreak of the violent uprising in 2000 they wrote patriotic songs. They became known as creators of "Zionist hip-hop". In further contrast to the generally rebellious, "outlaw" nature of most hip-hop, they also praise army service and eschew drugs and smoking. With occasional Arabic lyrics and songs like "Peace in the Middle East", their stance is described as desirous of a better future but unapologetic about the present. Subliminal and Ha'Tzel also helped discover the Palestinian rapper Tamer Nafar; they collaborated but eventually fell out over political differences. The bitter end of their musical relationship is chronicled in the documentary Channels of Rage.

SHI 360
Shai Haddad was born in Haifa, Israel and then moved to Montreal, Canada when he was eleven. He was very resistant to the move and didn't like the change. When attending a public school he was faced with a lot of Antisemitism.
He also perceived a lot of friction within the local Jewish community. He was seen as an outcast to them because his friends were mostly black and Hispanic. The Canadian hip-hop scene helped jump-start his rap career. He would go to open mic nights and he also recorded his first vinyl single, "Linguistiks," through his own label, IntelektMusik, in Montreal. In 1996 Haddad returned to Israel to pursue his rap career. This time he went under the name SHI 360 (Hebrew: שי 360). SHI stands for Supreme Hebrew Intelekt and 360 represents his return to Israel from Canada. SHI 360's lyrics reflect political and social themes as opposed to the feel-good pop that dominates the Israeli radio. In the song “Break the silence” he talks to kids speaking up about abuse from home life. He considers himself a conscious MC. SHI 360 hopes to change the view on how radio is supposed to sound in Israel.

After a few years rapping, he met Israeli rapper Subliminal who at the time was known as “Caveman.” Haddad suggested the name Subliminal and he took that name as his stage name. Subliminal and David Levy started the T.A.C.T. Entertainment group.

DAM

Though many Jewish Israeli rappers are present in the country's pop culture, fewer Palestinian hip-hop groups have surfaced, though one has gained widespread popularity. The group's name, DAM, is the Arabic verb for "to last forever/eternity" (دام) and the Hebrew word for "blood" (דם), but can also be an acronym for "Da Arabian MCs." DAM could be argued to be the polar opposite of Subliminal’s right-wing stance. Formed in 1998, DAM is noted as the first Arab-Israeli hip-hop group and consists of three Palestinian men who hold Israeli citizenship as well: Tamer Nafer, his brother Suhell, and a friend, Mahmoud Jreri. Though the rappers mostly sing in Arabic, they do write songs in Hebrew and English as well, to ensure that they reach all of their intended audiences. The content of their songs is largely focused on the many conflicts existent between Israel and the Palestinians, including the issue of Palestinians feeling like second-class citizens of the country. DAM often challenges Zionism with their lyrics and accuses the Israeli government of racism and inequality. Many of their songs demand treatment equal to that offered to the Jewish citizens of Israel. According to lead rapper Nafer, “our message is one of humanity- but it’s also political- we make protest music.” DAM's first single of 2001, “Meen Erhabe?” (or “Who’s the Terrorist?”) was not even released by an official recording label, but was still downloaded from online by over one million visitors. Their latest rap single, “Born Here,” is written and performed in Hebrew to further expand their audience. Nafar has also stated that the reasoning for the transition to Hebrew lyrics is to be able to transmit the messages of the injustices to the Israelis very clearly. Nafar has said that his position is to replace politicians; “Politicians don’t talk to our generation. But politics is the way of our life, so I’m bringing the way of our life in their language.” In November 2006, DAM ultimately released an official album, titled “Dedication.”

Sagol 59

Sagol 59 (Born Khen Rotem, October 1, 1968) is a Jerusalem based hip-hop MC. Raised on a Kibbutz in Israel. After his required 3-year stint in the Israeli Defense Forces, Sagol turned to music, beginning his career in blues, funk and rock before moving on to hip hop in the Mid 1990s. Shortly after, he relocated to Jerusalem. Sagol was picked up by the city's seminal (and now defunct) indie label, Fact Records. He was later signed to major label NMC Records.

With 5 full-length albums to date, plenty of musical collaborations with diverse artists and many live shows in Israel and overseas (U.S, Europe)Sagol has anticipated Israel's current Rap boom and cemented his position as one of its leaders.

Within the last decade, Sagol has participated in many events alongside Palestinian and Arab musicians, and has performed alongside many well-known artists and overseas: Matisyahu, DJ Spooky, Kenny Mohammed The Human Orchestra, Remedy, Killah Priest, Sole of Anticon, Spearhead's Michael Franti, Yitz Jordan aka Y-Love, Taskforce, and Israeli artists such as Hadag Nachash, Coolooloosh, Mook-e, Teapacks, Yossi Fine and many others.

In 2001 he received critical praise for his groundbreaking collaboration “Summit Meeting"(feat. Tamer Nafar of DAM & Shaanan Streett of Hadag Nachash), the first-ever collaborative recording featuring both Israeli and Palestinian MCs. He regularly hosts the Corner Prophets series, a cultural initiative meant to unite the diverse cultural communities located in Jerusalem through a shared interest in hip-hop. By working with Corner Prophets, Sagol's goal is to inspire a new generation of Israelis and Palestinians that turn to art, not violence, as a means to find a common ground.

Notable Israeli hip hop crews and rappers

Fishi Ha-Gadol
Muki
Tamer Nafar
Strong Black Coffee
Marvin Casey
Itay Lukach
Ron Nesher
Shabak Samech

See also
 Music of Israel
 Miri Ben-Ari
 Palestinian hip hop

References

External links
 Mitrck, Joshua, Israeli Hip-Hop Takes on Mideast Politics
 Hartong, Kelly, Israeli Hip-Hop Debating Gaza

 
1990s in music
2000s in music
Israeli music